Pehlivan means hero or champion in Turkish, in the context of wrestling.

It may refer to:

 Pehlivan, Turkish surname
 Oil wrestlers
 Pehlivan (film), 1984 Turkish film